Gila Bend High School is a high school in Gila Bend, Arizona under the jurisdiction of the Gila Bend Unified School District. It is a member of the CAA.

References

External links 

 

Public high schools in Arizona
Schools in Maricopa County, Arizona